Aid to Palestinians may refer to: 
 United Nations Relief and Works Agency for Palestine Refugees in the Near East (UNRWA)
 Medical Aid for Palestinians
 Aid to the Palestinians, from the European Union